Rozgity  is a village in the administrative district of Gmina Dywity, within Olsztyn County, Warmian-Masurian Voivodeship, in northern Poland.

The village has a population of 79.

References

Rozgity